Redeemer may refer to:

Religion 
Redeemer (Christianity), referring to Jesus Christ
Mahdi, described in Islam as "the Redeemer (of mankind)"
Redeemer Presbyterian Church (New York City)

Other organisations 
Redeemer Lutheran College, school in Queensland, Australia
Redeemer Baptist School, school in New South Wales, Australia
Redeemers, Southern U.S. political coalition that overthrew Reconstruction in the 1870s

Fiction

Comics 
The Redeemer, a Warhammer 40k comic published by Games Workshop
 Redeemer (Image Comics), a character from the Spawn comics
 Redeemers (comics), a Marvel Comics team connected to the Thunderbolts
 Redeemer, a Wildstorm character and member of the Paladins who appeared in Number of the Beast
 America Redeemers (also known as the Redeemers), a Marvel Comics team from Earth-712 who opposed the Squadron Supreme
 Darkhold Redeemers, a Marvel Comics team concerned with the supernatural book the Darkhold
 Elektra and Wolverine: The Redeemer, a series of graphic novels

Other fiction 
Redeemer (2004 film), a 2004 Brazilian film
Redeemer (2014 film), a 2014 Chilean action film
Hunter: The Reckoning – Redeemer, a 2003 video game
Redeemer (video game), 2017

Music 
Redeemer (Wheat Chiefs album), 1996
Redeemer (Machinae Supremacy album), 2006
Redeemer (Norma Jean album), 2006
Redeemer (D'espairsRay album), 2007
"Redeemer", a song written by Jonathan Davis of Korn, performed by Marilyn Manson on the Queen of the Damned soundtrack
"Redeemer", a song by Kutless from their 2009 album It Is Well

See also 
Christ the Redeemer (disambiguation), various meanings
Church of the Redeemer (disambiguation), multiple organisations